2015 TBL Playoffs was the final phase of the 2014–15 Turkish Basketball League. The playoffs started on 20 May 2014. Fenerbahçe Ülker were the defending champions.

The eight highest placed teams of the regular season qualified for the playoffs. In the quarter-finals a best-of-three was played, in the semi-finals a best-of-five and in the finals a best-of-seven playoff format was used.

Pınar Karşıyaka competed against Anadolu Efes in the finals, won the series 4-2 and got their 2nd championship.

Bracket

Quarterfinals

Fenerbahçe Ülker vs. Galatasaray Liv Hospital

Anadolu Efes vs. Türk Telekom

Darüşşafaka Doğuş vs. Trabzonspor Medical Park

Pınar Karşıyaka vs. Banvit

Semifinals

Fenerbahçe Ülker vs. Pınar Karşıyaka

Anadolu Efes vs. Trabzonspor Medical Park

Finals

Anadolu Efes vs. Pınar Karşıyaka

References
TBL.org.tr
TBF.org.tr

Playoff
Turkish Basketball Super League Playoffs